Departure Lake may refer to:

Departure Lake (Ontario), a lake in Cochrane District, Ontario, Canada
Departure Lake, Ontario, a place in Haggart Township, Cochrane District, Ontario, Canada
Lac Departure (Departure Lake), a lake in Côte-Nord region, Quebec, Canada